The US 12 Bridges are two bridges carrying U.S. Route 12 (US 12) over Interstate 94 (I-94) and the westbound I-94 ramp in Dearborn, Michigan. They were listed on the National Register of Historic Places in 2000.

History
The utility of constructing a cross-town expressway through Detroit was recognized as early as the 1920s. Planning continued off and on through the early 1940s, when the state began anticipating post-war projects.  Originally called the "Crosstown Expressway," the Detroit City Council approved a petition to rename the proposed stretch the "Edsel Ford Expressway" in April 1946. The  Edsel Ford would ultimately require the construction of over 70 structures, of which the US-12 bridges are two.

Work began on the freeway in 1948, starting on the Detroit–Dearborn border, with the US 12 bridges being the first structures opened for bidding. The firm of Darin & Armstrong won the construction contract with a bid of $925,000, and began work in August 1948. The bridges were completed by August 1949. A ribbon cutting ceremony, presided over by State Highway Commissioner Charles Ziegler, was held on August 17.

Description
Of the two bridges, the span over I-94 is the longer. The bridge has eighteen stringers, more closely spaced in the center of the deck to support what once was a streetcar line. Channels are laid over and riveted onto the stringers. The railing, installed in 1967, has a precast base and horizontal pipe.

Gallery

See also
 
 
 
 
 List of bridges on the National Register of Historic Places in Michigan
 National Register of Historic Places listings in Wayne County, Michigan

References

Road bridges on the National Register of Historic Places in Michigan
Bridges completed in 1948
Buildings and structures in Dearborn, Michigan
Bridges in Wayne County, Michigan
U.S. Route 12
Bridges of the United States Numbered Highway System
National Register of Historic Places in Wayne County, Michigan
Plate girder bridges in the United States